Chile at the 1924 Summer Olympics in Paris, France was the nation's fourth appearance out of seven editions of the Summer Olympic Games.

Athletics

Three athletes represented Chile in 1924. It was the nation's fourth appearance in the sport.

Ranks given are within the heat.

Boxing 

Four boxers represented Chile at the 1924 Games. It was the nation's debut in the sport. Abarca was the most successful boxer, advancing to the quarterfinals. The other three boxers each lost their first bout.

Cycling

Three cyclists represented Chile in 1924. It was the nation's second appearance in the sport.

Track cycling

Ranks given are within the heat.

Fencing

A single, male, fencer represented Chile in 1924. It was the nation's debut in the sport.

 Men

Ranks given are within the pool.

Tennis

 Men

References
 Official Olympic Reports

Nations at the 1924 Summer Olympics
1924
Olympics